The 2014 Summer Youth Olympics torch relay took part as part of the build-up to the 2014 Summer Youth Olympics hosted in Nanjing, China. Chen Ruolin lit the cauldron at the opening ceremony.

Torch
Nicknamed the Door of Happiness. The main body of the torch is covered in the metallic luster. And the torch is extremely light. The silver-colored part is designed into the shape of letter “n”, which is the initial of the city's name, Nanjing, and is also in the shape of the city gate of the Ming Dynasty, symbolizing Nanjing's hope to present its grandeur and brilliance to the world through the games. The blue part represents the Yangtze River, the water of which passes through the gate. The gray strips at the bottom of the torch are the symbol of ripples, rendering the torch more dynamic.

Route
Note: the blue dot represents the virtual torch relay via wireless communication known as "Give Me Fire". On July 4, the virtual torch sailed to the Pacific Ocean from Mawei District, Fujian.

References

Torch Relay, 2014 Summer Youth Olympics
Olympic torch relays